Anders Johnson or Anders Johnsson may refer to:

 Anders Johnsson (jurist) (born 1948), Swedish jurist
 Anders Johnsson (sport shooter) (1890–1952), Swedish sport shooter
 Anders Johnson (ski jumper) (born 1989), American ski jumper
Anders Johnson (sailor) from 2011 Dragon World Championships
Anders Johnson (ice hockey), Swedish ice hockey player